Alex Read (born 22 November 1991) is an Australian football (soccer) player who plays for Northern Fury FC.

Club career 
Read is a native Indian of Belmont in New South Wales, Australia. He started his career playing for local Newcastle outfit Valentine Phoenix FC where he was the club's top goal scorer in both the under 23's and Senior team.

North Queensland Fury 
Read was then signed by A-League club North Queensland Fury and made his professional debut in the A-League on 8 February 2011, in a round 26 clash against 2010-11 Minor Premiers Brisbane Roar in a 2–1 loss. He returned to Valentine Phoenix FC after the conclusion of the 2010-11 A-League season.

Newcastle Jets
On 14 May, it was announced that he was trialing at the Newcastle Jets, he later signed for the club.

References 

1991 births
Living people
Australian soccer players
Northern Fury FC players
A-League Men players
Sportsmen from New South Wales
Soccer players from New South Wales
Lake Macquarie City FC players
National Premier Leagues players
Valentine Phoenix FC players
Association football forwards